Getty Oil was an American oil marketing company with its origins as part of the large integrated oil company founded by J. Paul Getty.

History

J. Paul Getty incorporated Getty Oil in 1942. He had previously worked in the oil fields of Oklahoma along with his father George Getty. When George died, he left J. Paul with $500,000 and a projection that he would destroy the family business.

Starting in 1949, J. Paul Getty negotiated a 30-year old concession in the neutral zone between Saudi Arabia and Kuwait. Gordon Getty and his family inherited a 40% interest in the company when J. Paul Getty died in 1976. 

In 1984, after entering into a binding agreement to sell Getty and its 2.3-billion-barrel stockpile of proven oil reserves to Pennzoil, Gordon Getty struck a dramatic deal to sell the company to Texaco.

On November 19, 1985, in the case of Texaco, Inc. v. Pennzoil, Co., Pennzoil won a US$10.53 billion verdict against Texaco in the largest civil verdict in U.S. history as a result of the violation of the binding agreement.  Following extension litigation seeking to overturn the verdict, Texaco filed for bankruptcy, after which Pennzoil agreed to settle the case for $3 billion.

While the reserves were sold, only some of the refineries changed hands, and Getty continued to exist as a downstream entity. Getty gas stations in the Northeast were sold off as a condition of the buyout. The company became known as Getty Petroleum Marketing Inc.

Getty Petroleum Marketing was sold to Lukoil in 2000, and Lukoil sold it to Cambridge Securities LLC in February 2011. Getty Petroleum filed for bankruptcy protection (Chapter 11) on December 5, 2011.

At one point, Getty Oil owned a majority stake of ESPN, before Getty's purchase by Texaco which then sold ESPN to ABC in 1984.

References

External links 
 Getty's Official Site

Defunct oil companies of the United States
Automotive fuel retailers
Gas stations in the United States
Convenience stores of the United States
Companies based in New York (state)
Companies based in Tulsa, Oklahoma
Getty family
Lukoil
Texaco
Companies that filed for Chapter 11 bankruptcy in 2011
Retail companies established in 1942
Retail companies disestablished in 2012
Energy companies established in 1942
Energy companies disestablished in 2012
Non-renewable resource companies established in 1942
1984 mergers and acquisitions